Coconino County is a county in the north-central part of the U.S. state of Arizona. Its population was 145,101 at the 2020 census. The county seat is Flagstaff. The county takes its name from Cohonino, a name applied to the Havasupai people. It is the second-largest county by area in the contiguous United States, behind San Bernardino County, California. It has , or 16.4% of Arizona's total area, and is larger than each of the nine smallest states in the U.S.

Coconino County comprises the Flagstaff metropolitan statistical area, Grand Canyon National Park, the federally recognized Havasupai Nation, and parts of the federally recognized Navajo, Hualapai, and Hopi nations. As a result, its relatively large Native American population makes up nearly 30% of the county's total population; it is mostly Navajo, with smaller numbers of other tribes.

The county was the setting for George Herriman's early 20th-century Krazy Kat comic strip.

History

After European Americans completed the Atlantic & Pacific Railroad in 1883, the region of northern Yavapai County began to undergo rapid growth. The people of the northern reaches had tired of the rigors of traveling to Prescott to conduct county business. They believed that they should have their own county jurisdiction, so petitioned in 1887 for secession from Yavapai and creation of a new Frisco County. This did not take place, but Coconino County was formed in 1891 and its seat was designated as Flagstaff.

Geography
It is the largest county by area in Arizona and the second-largest county in the United States (excluding boroughs in Alaska) after San Bernardino County in California. It has more land area than each of the following states: Connecticut, Delaware, Hawaii, Maryland, Massachusetts, New Hampshire, New Jersey, Rhode Island, and Vermont.

The Barringer Meteor Crater is located in Coconino County.

Adjacent counties
 Mohave County – west
 Yavapai County – south
 Gila County – south
 Navajo County – east
 San Juan County, Utah – northeast
 Kane County, Utah – north

Indian reservations
Coconino County has  of federally designated Indian reservations, second in scale only to Apache County. In descending order of area within the county, the reservations are the Navajo, Hualapai, Hopi, Havasupai, and Kaibab. The Havasupai Reservation is the only one that lies entirely within the county's borders.

National protected areas

 Apache-Sitgreaves National Forest (part)
 Coconino National Forest (part)
 Glen Canyon National Recreation Area (part)
 Grand Canyon National Park (part)
 Kaibab National Forest (part)
 Prescott National Forest (part)
 Sunset Crater Volcano National Monument
 Vermilion Cliffs National Monument
 Walnut Canyon National Monument
 Wupatki National Monument

Demographics

2000 census
As of the census of 2000, 116,320 people, 40,448 households, and 26,938 families were living in the county.  The population density was 6 people per square mile (2/km2).  The 53,443 housing units averaged 3 per sq mi (1/km2).  The racial makeup of the county was 63.1% White, 28.5% Native American, 1.0% African American, 0.8% Asian, 4.2% from other races, and 2.4% from two or more races.  About 10.9% of the population were Hispanics or Latinos of any race. Around 18.6% reported speaking Navajo at home, while 6.6% spoke Spanish.

Of the 40,448 households, 34.9% had children under the age of 18 living with them, 49.7% were married couples living together, 12.2% had a female householder with no husband present, and 33.4% were not families. About 22.1% of all households were made up of individuals, and 4.5% had someone living alone who was 65 years of age or older.  The average household size was 2.80, and the average family size was 3.36.

In the county, the age distribution was 28.7% under 18, 14.4% from 18 to 24, 29.2% from 25 to 44, 20.7% from 45 to 64, and 7.0% who were 65 or older.  The median age was 30 years. For every 100 females, there were 99.70 males.  For every 100 females age 18 and over, there were 97.20 males.

The median income for a household in the county was $38,256, and for a family was $45,873. Males had a median income of $32,226 versus $25,055 for females. The per capita income for the county was $17,139.  About 13.1% of families and 18.2% of the population were below the poverty line, including 22.3% of those under age 18 and 13.3% of those age 65 or over.

2010 census
As of the census of 2010, 134,421 people, 46,711 households, and 29,656 families were living in the county. The racial makeup of the county was 61.7% White (55.2% non-Hispanic White), 27.3% American Indian, 1.4% Asian, 1.2% African American, 0.1% Pacific Islander, 5.2% from other races, and 3.1% from two or more races. Those of Hispanic or Latino origin made up 13.5% of the population. The largest ancestry groups were:

 23.2% Navajo
 14.5% German
 11.3% Mexican
 9.9% English
 9.6% Irish
 3.6% Italian
 2.7% American
 2.2% Swedish
 2.1% Scottish
 2.0% French
 1.9% Norwegian
 1.9% Polish
 1.8% Scotch-Irish
 1.3% Dutch

Of the 46,711 households, 33.1% had children under the age of 18 living with them, 45.0% were married couples living together, 12.7% had a female householder with no husband present, 36.5% were not families, and 24.5% of all households were made up of individuals. The average household size was 2.69, and the average family size was 3.26. The median age was 31.0 years.

The median income for a household in the county was $49,510 and for a family was $58,841. Males had a median income of $42,331 versus $31,869 for females. The per capita income for the county was $22,632. About 11.6% of families and 18.6% of the population were below the poverty line, including 22.5% of those under age 18 and 13.8% of those age 65 or over.

Communities

Cities
 Flagstaff (county seat)
 Page
 Sedona (mostly in Yavapai County)
 Williams

Towns
 Fredonia
 Tusayan

Census-designated places

 Bellemont
 Bitter Springs
 Blue Ridge
 Cameron
 Doney Park
 Forest Lakes
 Fort Valley
 Grand Canyon Village
 Greenehaven
 Kachina Village
 Kaibab Estates West
 Kaibito
 LeChee
 Leupp
 Moenkopi
 Mormon Lake
 Mountain View Ranches
 Mountainaire
 Munds Park
 Oak Creek Canyon
 Parks
 Red Lake
 Supai
 Timberline-Fernwood
 Tolani Lake
 Tonalea
 Tuba City
 Valle
 Winslow West (mostly in Navajo County)

Other communities

 Big Springs
 Gray Mountain
 Happy Jack
 Jacob Lake
 Marble Canyon
 North Rim
 Rare Metals
 Robbers Roost
 Ryan
 Winona

Ghost towns
 Canyon Diablo
 Two Guns

Indian reservations
 Havasupai Indian Reservation
 Hopi Reservation
 Hualapai Indian reservation
 Kaibab Indian Reservation
 Navajo Nation

County population ranking
The population ranking of the following table is based on the 2010 census of Coconino County.
† county seat

Politics
Coconino County has trended towards the Democratic Party in modern times after being a Republican stronghold between the 1950s and 1980s. It was won by every Republican presidential nominee between 1952 and 1988; however, no Republican since George H. W. Bush in 1988 has managed to come within 6% of reclaiming the county. It is the only county from any state west of the Mississippi river that voted for Barry Goldwater in 1964 but has since voted for the democratic nominee in the most recent six presidential elections.

Economy
Grand Canyon Airlines and Air Grand Canyon are headquartered on the grounds of Grand Canyon National Park Airport in Tusayan.

In 2017, the largest employers in Coconino County were:

According to the Bureau of Economic Analysis, in 2019 the employment of Coconino County in the following sectors was:

Transportation
Flagstaff in Coconino County is a major highway junction, with Interstate 40 extending to the east and the west (connecting with Williams and Winslow, Arizona, for example), and with Interstate 17 extending south from Flagstaff to Phoenix and Maricopa County.  U.S. Routes 89 and 180 extend north from Flagstaff and connect it with the Grand Canyon National Park.

The Grand Canyon National Park Airport is a public airport located in Tusayan, near the South Rim of the Grand Canyon.

Flagstaff Pulliam Airport is a public airport located four miles (6 km) south of the central business district of Flagstaff, it is mostly used for general aviation but is also served by two commercial airlines.

There is a Greyhound Bus Lines station in Flagstaff, with regular service east–west along Interstate 40, and also north–south service to Phoenix along Interstate 17.

Amtrak has a passenger railroad stations in Flagstaff and formerly in Williams, with daily service on the Southwest Chief to the east towards Chicago, and to the west towards Los Angeles.

The Grand Canyon Railway, a tourist railroad, links Williams with the canyon's South Rim in the Grand Canyon National Park and has service every day except Christmas.

The Mountain Line provides public transportation bus service in the Flagstaff area.

Major highways

 
 
 
 
 
 
 
 
  State Route 64
  State Route 87
  State Route 89
  State Route 89A
  State Route 98
  State Route 99
  State Route 260
  State Route 264

Education
School districts include:

K-12:

 Ash Fork Joint Unified School District
 Flagstaff Unified School District
 Fredonia-Moccasin Unified School District
 Grand Canyon Unified School District
 Page Unified School District
 Tuba City Unified School District
 Williams Unified School District

Elementary:
 Chevelon Butte School District
 Maine Consolidated School District

Charter schools:
 Flagstaff Arts and Leadership Academy
 Northland Preparatory Academy

Bureau of Indian Education (BIE)-operated and affiliated tribal schools

 Greyhills Academy High School
 Havasupai Elementary School (BIE-operated)
 Kaibeto Boarding School (BIE-operated)
 Leupp Schools, Inc.
 Tuba City Boarding School (BIE-operated)

Tertiary education:
 Coconino County Community College
 Diné College Tuba City Center
 Northern Arizona University

See also
 National Register of Historic Places listings in Coconino County, Arizona
 USS Coconino County (LST-603)

References

External links

 
 
 Coconino County profile  at Arizona Department of Commerce
 Geologic Map of the Eastern Quarter of the Flagstaff 30ʹ x 60ʹ Quadrangle, Coconino County, Northern Arizona United States Geological Survey

 
Arizona placenames of Native American origin
1891 establishments in Arizona Territory
Populated places established in 1891